Via media is a Latin phrase meaning "the middle road" and is a philosophical maxim for life which advocates moderation in all thoughts and actions.

Originating from the Delphic Maxim nothing to excess and subsequent Ancient Greek philosophy where Aristotle (384–322 BCE) taught moderation, urging his students to follow the middle road between extremes, the via media was the dominant philosophical precept by which Ancient Roman civilisation and society was organised.

Erasmus

Anglicanism

The term via media is frequently claimed by Anglican proponents, though not without debate, as a term of apologetics. The idea of a middle way, between the Protestant traditions of Lutheranism and Reformed Christianity, as well as between the Roman Catholics and the Magisterial Reformers, goes back to early in the Protestant Reformation, when theologians such as Martin Bucer, Thomas Cranmer and Heinrich Bullinger advocated a religious solution in which secular authority would hold the ring in the religious dispute, and ensure political stability.

Historical Anglicanism  
Anglicanism, which emerged out of the English Reformation, was originally seen as a via media between two forms of Protestantism—Lutheranism and Reformed Christianity. Thomas Cranmer, the Archbishop of Canterbury who played a chief role in shaping Anglicanism, sought a middle way between Lutheranism and Calvinism, though he was closer to Calvinism. Historic Anglicanism is a part of the wider Reformed tradition, as "the founding documents of the Anglican church—the Book of Homilies, the Book of Common Prayer, and the Thirty-Nine Articles of Religion—expresses a theology in keeping with the Reformed theology of the Swiss and South German Reformation." The Most Rev. Peter Robinson, presiding bishop of the United Episcopal Church of North America, writes:

Richard Hooker
A recent scholarly study points out that, while Richard Hooker's Law of Ecclesiastical Polity has a reputation as "the classic depiction of the English via media based upon the sound triumvirate of scripture, reason and tradition", the actual term via media nowhere appears in the work (written in English).

In Tractarianism
Three centuries later, the phrase was used by John Henry Newman in setting out his influential views on Anglicanism, as part of the argument he brought forward with the Tractarian movement.
Via Media was the title of a series of the Tracts for Today, published by Newman around 1834. These tracts in particular used the title to pay homage to the inception of the Thirty-Nine Articles and in so doing claim that the Tractarian movement was of the same vein as early Church of England scholars and theologians. They examined the Elizabethan Settlement and reinterpreted it as a compromise between Rome and Reform.

The Tractarians promoted the idea of Anglicanism as a middle way between the extremes of Protestantism and Catholicism, which became later an idea of Anglicanism as a middle way between Rome and Protestantism itself.

In justification of its idea of a via media, the Oxford Movement attributed this position to the works of the Elizabethan theologian Richard Hooker and in particular his book Lawes of Ecclesiastical Polity, which is accepted as a founding work on Anglican theology, a view of Hooker promoted by John Keble, who was one of the first to argue that English theology underwent such a "decisive change" in Hooker’s hands.  However, Hooker does not use the phrase "via media" or "middle way" or the word "Anglican" in any of his works; the attribution of via media to him is much later. Hooker's work concerned the form of Protestant church government as an argument against the extreme advocates of Puritanism, arguing that elements of Church of England practice condemned by the Puritans, in particular the Book of Common Prayer and the institution of bishops, are proper and accord with Scripture. Later theologians analysed Hooker's approach to the particular doctrine of justification by faith as a middle way between the predestinationism of the extreme Calvinists and Lutheran and Arminian doctrines.

The Oxford Movement recast this via media as a middle way not within Protestantism but between Protestantism and Roman Catholicism. Its application to early Anglicanism has remained current in Anglican discourse.

Nordic Lutheranism
Some of the Nordic lutheran Churches, chiefly the national churches of Sweden, Finland and Norway, likewise consider themselves as via media churches. The latter professes its faith as "truly catholic, truly reformed, truly evangelical", a statement likewise echoed in the Canons of the Church of Sweden which states that the faith, confession and teachings of the Church are understood as an expression of the catholic christian faith. It further states that this does not serve to create a new, confessionally peculiar interpretation, but concerns the apostolic faith as carried down through the traditions of the Church. These sentiment of these churches as a via media are expressed outright in the Common Statement of the Porvoo Communion, a communion of european Anglican and Nordic and Baltic lutheran churches:

See also
Argument to moderation, a logical fallacy
Golden mean
Middle Way (Buddhist concept)
Wasat (Islamic term)
Lagom

References

Aristotelianism
Anglicanism